Folksingers 'Round Harvard Square is a collaborative folk album featuring Joan Baez, Bill Wood and Ted Alevizos; it is also Baez's debut appearance as six of the eighteen tracks were solos by her. The album was recorded by Stephen Fassett in "a friend's basement studio" in Boston, May 1959.

In 1963, an unauthorized reissue of the album was released on Squire Records as The Best of Joan Baez (minus four tracks that did not contain Baez' vocals — "Le Cheval dans la baignoire," "The Bold Soldier," "Lass from the Low Country" and "Rejected Lover"), but was withdrawn after Baez took legal action against it (by which time the album had already made the top-fifty on the U.S. albums charts).

Harvard Square is a place in Cambridge, Massachusetts; Baez had a residence at Club 47, located on the square.

Track listing

References

Joan Baez albums
1959 albums